{{DISPLAYTITLE:NZR EC class}}

The NZR EC class was a class of electric locomotive used in Christchurch, New Zealand. They replaced steam locomotives on trains through the Lyttelton rail tunnel between Lyttelton and Christchurch.

Introduction
Since its opening in 1867, the Christchurch to Lyttelton line had become extremely busy with both suburban and goods trains passing through the  Lyttelton Tunnel, which had been opened in 1867. Smoke accumulating in the tunnel from each successive train became a nuisance for train crews and passengers travelling through the tunnel. Although trials were conducted in 1909 using steam locomotive WF 436 which had been converted to oil firing, the cost of oil alone meant that no further work was done.

In 1925, the English consultancy of Merz & McLellan was commissioned by then Minister of Railways, Gordon Coates, to report on electrifying the suburban networks in Auckland, Wellington, Christchurch and Dunedin. The report, released in August 1925, recommended that of the Christchurch system, only the  Lyttelton line warranted electrification due to the volume of traffic and the Lyttelton tunnel. To operate the line, Merz & McLellan recommended purchasing five electric locomotives to haul all trains on this line, and that electric multiple units would not be necessary. The new electrification should be the same 1.5 kV DC as used at Otira and later in Wellington.

Accordingly, six EC class electric locomotives were purchased from English Electric exclusively for this work in 1928. Initially classified in the E class, the later 'C' designation indicated these locomotives were to be allocated to Christchurch, as opposed to the EO class which was allocated to Otira.

In service
The EC class handled all duties from Christchurch to Lyttelton. Early problems with motor flashover and armature shaft fractures during the transition from series to parallel meant that the parallel connections were removed, halving the voltage to the motors and reducing the running speed to 42 km/h.

Withdrawal
By 1967, the EC class was reaching the end of its economic working life. Due to the locomotive changeover for such a short section being costly, and with drainage work going on in the vicinity of the Woolston sub-station, it was decided to reduce the losses made on this section and at the same time make it easier for the drainage work to proceed by withdrawing the electric locomotives. Diesel locomotives would be able to handle all trains through the tunnel.

The first of the class, EC 11, was the first to be withdrawn. The last locomotive of the class in service was EC 9, which hauled the last electric train over this line on 18 September 1970. Five of the locomotives were then scrapped while one was put aside for the Ferrymead-based Tramway Historical Society.

Preservation
Class leader EC 7 along with EO 3 was donated to the Tramway Historical Society upon withdrawal. Stored in the Linwood locomotive depot, the locomotive was transported to Ferrymead by road in 1972, where it nearly ran away during the unloading operation. The two electric locomotives were stored by the tramway section until 1977 when the THS handed the two locomotives over to the Ferrymead Railway-based Electric Traction Group. Both locomotives were shifted onto the railway tracks using electrical leads off the 600 V DC tramway overhead and several tracksets, which were moved with the locomotives to the railway. In 1978, part of the Ferrymead line at Moorhouse station was fitted with overhead catenary and in 1980, some test runs were done with EC 7 at 600 V using the tramway power supply. This led to the acquisition of three mercury-arc rectifiers to power the railway, as well as the trams and trolley-buses.

With construction of a substation able to supply the railway, tramway and trolley-buses was subsequently commenced and in November 1988, it was officially opened with trains hauled by EC 7 on the electrified section of the Railway. EC 7 is periodically operated at the Park, usually double-heading with EO 3. This is due to the lack of electrification on the Moorhouse station loop, which does not allow one locomotive to head the train on its own.

References

Bibliography 

 
 
 Parsons, David, New Zealand Railway Motive Power 2002, (2002), Chapter 1,

External links

Maintenance of Ec loco c1960 (photo)
Unloading Ec loco onto wharf c1929 (photo)

Bo-Bo locomotives
English Electric locomotives
1500 V DC locomotives
Electric locomotives of New Zealand
3 ft 6 in gauge locomotives of New Zealand
Railway locomotives introduced in 1929